The 1940 Tulsa Golden Hurricane football team represented the University of Tulsa during the 1940 college football season. In their second year under head coach Chet Benefiel, the Golden Hurricane compiled a 7–3 record (4–0 against conference opponents) and won the Missouri Valley Conference championship.

Schedule

References

Tulsa
Tulsa Golden Hurricane football seasons
Missouri Valley Conference football champion seasons
Tulsa Golden Hurricane football